Hanessian Foreland is a relatively low, snow-covered foreland or peninsula, over  long and  wide, on the coast of Marie Byrd Land, Antarctica. It extends seaward between Siniff Bay and the western end of the Getz Ice Shelf. It was mapped by the United States Geological Survey from surveys and U.S. Navy aerial photography, 1959–65, and was named by the Advisory Committee on Antarctic Names after John Hanessian, Jr. (1925–74), of George Washington University, Washington, D.C., a noted authority on political science and international affairs. At the time of his death he was on leave to the National Science Foundation. From 1954 to 1958, he served on the National Academy of Sciences staff and made a substantial contribution to the Committee on Polar Research in the planning and carrying out of the United States International Geophysical Year program.

References

Peninsulas of Marie Byrd Land